Shoaybiyeh or Shoeybiyeh may refer to:
 Shoaybiyeh-ye Gharbi Rural District
 Shoaybiyeh-ye Sharqi Rural District